Diana al-Hadid (born 1981) is a Syrian-born American contemporary artist who creates sculptures, installations, and drawings using various media. She lives and works in Brooklyn, New York.

Early life and education
Al-Hadid was born in Aleppo, Syria. When she was five, her family immigrated to Cleveland, Ohio, but she grew up mostly in North Canton, Ohio.  She grew up in an Islamic household. Al-Hadid decided at the age of 11 that she wanted to be an artist. She was inspired by family vacations to the middle east, visiting the Jeita Grotto in Lebanon and experiencing Islamic architecture.

In 2003, Al-Hadid received a BA in art history and a BFA in sculpture from Kent State University in Ohio. In 2005, she received an MFA in sculpture from Virginia Commonwealth University, Richmond. In 2007, she attended the Skowhegan School of Painting and Sculpture, the same year she had her first solo exhibition.

Work

Al-Hadid makes sculptures from a large variety of materials such as steel, fiberglass, wood, aluminum, bronze, cardboard, expanded polystyrene, reinforced polymer gypsum, and wax. She often works large-scale, working up to 4 meters tall, making large dreamlike or ghostly architectural forms out of dripping repetitive forms

Much of Al-Hadid's sculpture is inspired by architecture, Surrealism, and painting. Al-Hadid notes architectural influences such as: the Sagrada Familia, a house built by Salvador Dali, the architectural theorist Christian Norberg-Schulz, as well as the intricacy and ornamentation found in Islamic and Gothic architecture. Painting influences for Al-Hadid include northern Renaissance painting, Mannerist painting, Pieter Bruegel, Cy Twombly, and the presence of floating figures. Figures have shown up in her later work; she notes: "Islamic belief forbids figuration, and it's something I want to address."

Many of Al-Hadid's sculptures have narrative or mythological references, such as Scheherzade, Ariadne, and the Roman muse Gradiva from Wilhelm Jensen's 1961 Novella, who was also celebrated by the Surrealists. Al-Hadid states: "I was raised [...] in a culture that very much prizes storytelling and the oral tradition. My work is partially inspired by myths and folklore from both Western and Arabic cultures."

Al-Hadid cites Judy Pfaff and David Altmejd as sculptural inspirations.

In 2018, Al-Hadid had her first public art installation, entitled Delirious Matter, in Madison Square Park. The installation featured four sculptures placed around the park made of polymer gypsum and fiberglass. Delirious Matter was supported in part by an award from the National Endowment for the Arts.

In 2019, Al-Hadid was commissioned by MTA Arts & Design to create a permanent installation of two murals in the mezzanine spaces at the 34th Street. The two murals, entitled The Arches of Old Penn Station and The Arc of Gradiva, were recognized by the CODAawards.

Collections and Awards 
In 2009, she was a USA Rockefeller Fellow and a New York Foundation for the Arts Fellow. In 2007 she won a Pollock-Krasner Foundation Grant, in 2011 she won a Joan Mitchell Foundation Grant. In 2020, she received The Academy of Arts and Letters Art Award.

Collections holding her work include the DeCordova Museum and Sculpture Park, Whitney Museum of American Art, and the Virginia Museum of Fine Arts,  Al-Hadid has shown work at the Secession in Vienna, Austria;

References

1981 births
American women sculptors
Bard College faculty
Kent State University alumni
Living people
People from Aleppo
Syrian women sculptors
Virginia Commonwealth University alumni
21st-century Syrian artists
21st-century American sculptors
Skowhegan School of Painting and Sculpture alumni
People from North Canton, Ohio
21st-century American women artists
Syrian sculptors
Syrian artists
American women academics